The 1970 South Dakota Coyotes football team was an American football team that represented the University of South Dakota in the North Central Conference (NCC) during the 1970 NCAA College Division football season. In its fifth season under head coach Joe Salem, the team compiled a 4–4–2 record (3–2–1 against NCC opponents), finished in third place out of seven teams in the NCC, and outscored opponents by a total of 290 to 227. The team played its home games at Inman Field in Vermillion, South Dakota.

Running back Steve Pelot received first-team honors on the 1970 Little All-America college football team.

Schedule

References

South Dakota
South Dakota Coyotes football seasons
South Dakota Coyotes football